Kwon Jin-Young (born 23 October 1991) is a South Korean footballer who plays as a right back or defensive midfielder for Busan IPark.

Career
Kwon made his debut for Busan in a 1–0 defeat to Suwon Bluewings on 11 September 2013. In 2015 he joined army team Sangju Sangmu to complete his mandatory military service, and returned to his parent club in 2017.

Club career statistics
As of 21 December 2019

References

External links 
 

1991 births
Living people
Association football midfielders
South Korean footballers
Busan IPark players
K League 1 players
K League 2 players